New People is a political party in Russia formed in Moscow on 1 March 2020. New People is considered a liberal party, and observers have called it centrist or centre-right.

It was established in March 2020 by Alexey Nechayev, the founder of the Russian cosmetics company Faberlic. Nechayev was elected as party chairman during the second party congress, held on August 8, 2020. Alexander Davankov is the head of the party executive committee.

In 2020, the party entered four regional parliaments on party lists, earning the right to participate in the 2021 elections to the State Duma without collecting voters' signatures.

The party opposed many policies of the ruling United Russia, although is supportive towards Vladimir Putin specifically and has been accused of being a spoiler party to attract young and liberal voters.

History

In January 2020, Alexey Nechayev announced the party's creation to the media.

On 1 March 2020, the constituent congress of New People was held. 55 party regional branches were created. Official party registration was received from the Russian Ministry of Justice at the end of March.  

In April 2020, the party sent an appeal to the State Duma and the Federation Council and called on them to adopt additional laws eliminating contradictions in respect of the absence of an official emergency regime in the country.

As of 1 July 2020, New People had 55 registered regional branches, which began preparing to take part in the regional elections of September 2020 in 12 regions of the country. Also, the party declared its readiness and intent to take part in the elections to the State Duma in 2021.

On 8 August 2020, the second congress of the party was held in Moscow at which its founder Alexey Nechayev was elected chairman of the party.

At the end of 2020, the party announced that its election campaign for the State Duma of the VIII convocation would be led by the well-known political strategist Yevgeny Minchenko.

On 4 July 2021, a party congress was held at which the party's list and candidates for participation in the 2021 legislative election were nominated. Party leader Alexey Nechaev headed the federal list of the party. The second number in the federal list was the former Mayor of Yakutsk Sardana Avksentyeva.

According to the election results, the party gained 5.3% of the vote, winning 13 seats in the State Duma. New People became the first party not from the "big four" (United Russia, Communist Party of the Russian Federation, Liberal Democratic Party of Russia and A Just Russia — For Truth) since 2007 to overcome the 5% barrier and form its own faction. In addition to the 13 deputies elected on the party list of the party, the New People faction also included two independent deputies elected in single-mandate constituencies: Dmitry Pevtsov and Oleg Leonov.

On 15 February 2022, New People's Duma faction voted against the recognition of the separatist regions of Ukraine as independent states. In a statement the party warned against jeopardizing peace and human lives in an escalating Ukraine conflict and accused the political leadership of distracting from internal affairs by seeking conflict with other nations. However, the party later withdrew its statement and proclaimed its support for the invasion.

On 16 August 2022, the party called for Instagram to be unblocked.

Ideology 
According to electronic media, the party's goal is to "reorient the state" from caring for officials to serving citizens.

The party has a centre-right ideology and considers self-employed people, as well as representatives of small business, its social base. It combines support for the values of popular capitalism such as private property, a competitive economy, a decrease in the state's share in governing the country, with a social agenda, the rights of people with disabilities and an accessible barrier-free environment, as well as environmental issues, animal protection, garbage collection problems.

An important part of the party's position is the renewal and modernization of management systems and political institutions. Support for the development of modern technologies, science and education is declared.

The party attracts social entrepreneurs and activists from the regions as candidates, focusing on the regional agenda.

 The party proposes to make electable positions of heads of city and regional police departments, district inspectors, prosecutors and mayors of cities. They also raise the issue of banning one person from holding one position more than twice in a lifetime. 
The party also proposes to reduce the number of state structures and officials, to reduce the powers of police and other government security structures, which the party members call inflated, to limit the costs of maintaining officials and state top managers. 
The party considers it necessary to carry out a large-scale reform of the Ministry of Internal Affairs and other power structures. One of their proposals for reform is to double the salaries of ordinary police officers. 
It is important for the party to shift budget funding from Moscow to the construction of infrastructure and job creation in the regions. The party also demands that each person be provided free of charge land for the construction of his own house or estate no further than 150 km from the place of actual residence. 
Related to this is the theme of road construction and road safety announced by the New People. The statements of the party representatives contain specific measures related to the establishment of warranty periods for road repairs, the prohibition of "mobile ambushes", the dismantling of 50% of traffic cameras and the installation of separators on the highways. 
Party leader Alexey Nechayev and other party members have repeatedly proposed to increase the border of the special tax regime for the self-employed to 5 million rubles of income per year. Another important aspect of stimulating business, from the point of view of the party, is to start teaching children the basics of entrepreneurship and financial literacy at school. 
A number of specific nutrition and health initiatives have also been added to the party program. The party is in favor of increasing the federal subsidy for school and pre-school meals by at least 50%, as well as a ban on harmful substances (antibiotics, trans fats and growth hormones) in the food of Russians.
The party declares that all enterprises that harm the health of Russians are obliged to reduce the harmful effect: either modernize production or close down.
The electoral barrier for the passage of parties to the State Duma "New People" propose to reduce from 5% of the number of voters to 1 million votes. Elections are proposed to be held in electronic form, and for participation in them, citizens should be awarded incentive points for paying for housing and communal services or taxes. 
The party proposes to increase the participation of citizens in state and municipal government by expanding the practice of people's budgeting.
The party stands for the abolition of laws used to implement state censorship: in particular, the law on extremism and the law on insulting government officials.

Elections 
On 1 June 2020, the Ministry of Justice added the party to the list of associations eligible to participate in elections.

Election commissions did not allow party lists to participate in the elections in the Belgorod and Voronezh Oblasts, as well as to the elections to the city duma of Rostov-on-Don, by rejecting voters signatures.

On the Single Election Day, 13 September 2020, the party overcame the electoral barrier in all four regions where it participated, namely in Novosibirsk (7.0%), Kaluga (8.08%), Ryazan (5.7%) and Kostroma (7.5%). The party also took part in the elections to the Tomsk City Duma having received 10,945 votes.

In the elections to the city duma of Krasnodar, the election commission announced the party's result in 4.97% of votes. Party candidates also took part in municipal elections in Samara and Nizhny Novgorod.

The party ranked second in terms of financial expenditures in the elections in the third quarter of 2020, spending 179 million rubles, after United Russia with 261 million rubles.

Election results

Federal parliamentary elections

Regional parliamentary elections 
Regional parliaments of Russia in which New People is represented.

Leaders
Irena Lukyanova, 1 March – 8 August 2020
Alexey Nechayev, since 8 August 2020

Criticism 
The party, like other new parties that appeared at the beginning of 2020, is accused of spoiling, justifying this opinion by the fact of quick registration and the absence of obstacles from the authorities. In addition, the leader of the New People, Alexey Nechayev, is a member of the Central Council of the All-Russia People's Front, headed by Vladimir Putin. The party is also accused of having links with the current government. So, in December 2020, the party's campaign was headed by political strategist Yevgeny Minchenko, who is close to the presidential administration. According to Open Media sources in the party leadership, Nechayev's entourage and the presidential administration, the new composition of the campaign headquarters should adjust the party's strategy so that the constitutional majority in the State Duma remains with United Russia, and the New People return to their electoral niche - educated middle class aged 18-30.

Pavel Salin, director of the Center for Political Science Research at the Financial University under the Government, called the party "a spoiler for street protest activity".

According to the results of the investigation by MBKh Media, the popularity of the party was ensured not so much by the creativity of its members or the "marathon of ideas", but by the promotion strategy in the regions. MBKh Media came to this conclusion in the course of studying the party's partnerships with regional media. Several media managers in different editions of the Central Federal District and the Southern Federal District confirmed to MBKh Media the facts of cooperation with the party without formalizing the relevant documents and complying with the law on advertising. Publications publish the materials needed by New People, covering its activities in a positive light, for money, without making a mandatory note about it in publications, as required by Russian law.

In the legislative assembly of Omsk Oblast, the New People party opposed the inclusion in the agenda of the next session of the issue of returning direct elections of mayors and heads of districts, although such an item was in their election program. At the same time, the party, before the elections to the State Duma of the VIII convocation, in its program spoke about the need to return direct elections, this was stated at the federal level by the leader of the New People, Alexey Nechayev. As the leader of the New People faction in the Legislative Assembly of Omsk Oblast, Ilya Smirnov, later explained, the faction opposed the inclusion of the Communist Party bill on the agenda, because the explanatory note to the bill stated that the bill would not require additional budget expenditures, while the mayoral elections cost money.

Sanctions
In December 2022 the EU sanctioned New People in relation to the 2022 Russian invasion of Ukraine.

Notes

References

Registered political parties in Russia
Political parties established in 2020
2020 establishments in Russia
Communitarianism
Liberal parties in Russia